Eilish O'Carroll (born 5 November 1952) is an Irish actress, writer, comedian and cast-member of the popular BBC sitcom, Mrs. Brown's Boys, where she plays the title character's best friend and neighbour, Winnie McGoogan. She also played Dr Flynn in the stage version of the show. Eilish is the sister of Mrs. Brown's Boys star and creator, Brendan O'Carroll.

Career
O'Carroll has been a cast member of Mrs. Brown's Boys since its incarnation. Eilish played the role of Winnie McGoogan since the show's debut in 2011. She reprised her role in the 2014 film, Mrs. Brown's Boys D'Movie and the 2017 chat show All Round to Mrs. Brown's.

In 2013, O'Carroll wrote and starred in an autobiographical one-woman stage show entitled, 'Live Love Laugh'. She debuted the show at the Edinburgh Fringe Festival for which she received positive reviews. She subsequently toured Live Love Laugh throughout the UK and Ireland up until 2018.

It was announced that O'Carroll would be a contestant on the third series of the Irish version of Dancing with the Stars in 2019.

Personal life
She married her husband in 1971 with whom she had two sons, Stuart and Lee.

In 2003 O'Carroll began a relationship with a woman. She has stated she was homophobic until she came out in her forties. She now resides in Cork with her partner, Marian O'Sullivan.

In 2018, she was extremely outspoken in favour of the Together for Yes campaign during the referendum to amend the Irish constitution via the Thirty-sixth Amendment of the Constitution of Ireland.

Filmography

Film

Television

Stage

References

External links

Actresses from Dublin (city)
Irish television actresses
Living people
Irish lesbian actresses
21st-century Irish actresses
1952 births